Service-oriented Software Engineering (SOSE), also referred to as service engineering, is a software engineering methodology focused on the development of software systems by composition of reusable services (service-orientation) often provided by other service providers. Since it involves composition, it shares many characteristics of component-based software engineering, the composition of software systems from reusable components, but it adds the ability to dynamically locate necessary services at run-time. These services may be provided by others as web services, but the essential element is the dynamic nature of the connection between the service users and the service providers.

Service-oriented interaction pattern
There are three types of actors in a service-oriented interaction: service providers, service users and service registries. They participate in a dynamic collaboration which can vary from time to time. Service providers are software services that publish their capabilities and availability with service registries. Service users are software systems (which may be services themselves) that accomplish some task through the use of services provided by service providers. Service users use service registries to discover and locate the service providers they can use. This discovery and location occurs dynamically when the service user requests them from a service registry.

See also
 Service-oriented architecture (SOA)
 Service-oriented analysis and design
 Separation of concerns
 Component-based software engineering
 Web services

References

Further reading
Breivold, H.P. and Larsson, M. "Component-Based and Service-Oriented Software Engineering: Key Concepts and Principles" in Software Engineering and Advanced Applications, 2007. 33rd EUROMICRO Conference on, .
Stojanović, Zoran, A Method for Component-Based and Service-Oriented Software Systems Engineering. Doctoral Dissertation, Delft University of Technology, The Netherlands.

External links
University of Notre Dame Service-oriented Software Engineering Group homepage
Lancaster University Component & Service-oriented Software Engineering project homepage

Software engineering